List of some endemic flora and fauna species of Belize.

Fauna

Citheracanthus meermani
Cyllopsis wellingi
Epigomphus maya
Erpetegomphus leptophis
Metriopelma gutzkei
Poecilia teresae
Rana juliani
Reichlingia annae
Rhamdia typhla

Flora

Ageratum radicans
Amyris rhomboidea
Anemia bartlettii
Axonopus ciliatifolius
Calyptranthes bartlettii
Calyptranthes cuneifolia
Coccoloba lundellii
Crossopetalum gentlei
Dalechampia schippii
Dioscorea sandwithii
Dorstenia belizensis
Eugenia rufidula
Galactia anomala
Gymnanthes belizensis
Hypericum aphyllum
Koanophyllon sorensenii
Laubertia gentlei
Louteridium chartaceum
Metastelma stenomeres
Miconia ochroleuca
Mimosa pinetorum
Neurolaena schippii
Oxandra proctorii
Paepalanthus belizensis
Paepalanthus gentlei
Paspalum peckii
Passiflora urbaniana
Piper schippianum
Pisonia proctorii
Pithecellobium peckii
Plinia peroblata
Schippia concolor
Scutellaria lundellii
Syngonanthus bartlettii
Syngonanthus hondurensis
Syngonanthus lundellianus
Syngonanthus oneillii
Telanthophora bartlettii
Thelypteris schippii
Zamia prasina
Zinowiewia pallida

See also 
 Fauna of Belize
 Flora of Belize

References
Dwyer, J.D. & Spellman, D.L. (1981). A List of Dicotyledoneae of Belize. Rhodora 83 (834): 161-236

Endemism
Endemic species